Parapercis phenax is a fish species in the sandperch family, Pinguipedidae. It is found in Japan.

References

Pinguipedidae
Taxa named by John Ernest Randall
Taxa named by Takeshi Yamakawa
Fish described in 2006